The following is a list of episodes for the television show Hey Dad..!.

Unaired episodes

Season 1 (1987) 
The only season to include cast member Paul Smith (Simon), and guest appearances by Tina Bursill (Detective Sergeant Anne Burke). The first 12 episodes were produced in 1986. The season 1 opening credits feature the cast having their pictures taken during a picnic in the park. This was shot at Boronia Park in Hunters Hill.

Season 2 (1988) 
Marks the debut of new cast regular Christopher Mayer as Simon, and Joanne Samuel's first guest appearance as Jeanette. It is also the first time creative duties are assigned to writers other than Gary Reilly and John Flanagan. A new opening titles sequence features the regular cast members posing for photographs in the Kelly house.

Season 3 (1989-1990) 
With 49 episodes produced in 1989, this is the longest of any Hey Dad..! season, and the only one to feature guest appearances by Beth Buchanan (Cousin Elaine) and Kate Morris (Katie). It is also the first time that exterior shots of the Kelly house are shown.

Season 4 (1990-1991) 
The fourth season features Joanne Samuel's final appearance as neighbour Jeanette, and Naomi Watts' television series debut as Simon's girlfriend, Belinda. All Season 4 episodes were produced in 1990.

Season 5 (1991) 
The first of all remaining seasons to have 13 episodes. Highlighted as the final season of cast members Simone Buchanan (Debbie), Christopher Truswell (Nudge) and Moya O'Sullivan (Grandma). Rachael Beck (Sam) joins the cast. Features the first guest appearance of Matthew Krok (Arthur MacArthur) and a cameo by Hey Dad..! writer Kym Goldsworthy.

Season 6 (1991) 
Features the debut of Ben Oxenbould (Ben Hubner) and the return of Matthew Krok (Arthur MacArthur), with guest appearances by Rebecca Cross (Karen). Also noted as Christopher Mayer's final season. Personal childhood photos of the cast members are now displayed in the opening credits.

Season 7 (1992) 
Marks the final series appearance of Bill Young (Stan Hickey). Added to the opening credits are Ben Oxenbould and Matthew Krok.

Season 8 (1992) 
No major cast changes. Final guest appearances of Nikki Coghill (Jolanda) and Rod Zuanic (Bruno).

Season 9 (1992) 
Beth Champion (Shelley) debuts as Sam's friend. Highlighted by brief guest appearances from Joe Bugner and John O'Connell.

Season 10 (1993) 
Sarah Monahan leaves the series, and is replaced with Angela Keep as Jenny. Mary-Lou Stewart (Lyn) becomes a semi-regular on the show. Season 10 also features the introduction of the Woodlocks, and the television debut of a young Delta Goodrem (Cynthia).

Season 11 (1993) 
No major cast changes. Brief guest appearances by Stan Grant, Ray Meagher and James Morrison.

Season 12 (1993-1994) 
Final season of Robert Hughes (Martin Kelly) and Mary-Lou Stewart (Lyn). Mark Owen-Taylor (Greg Russell) joins the cast towards the end of the season.

Season 13 (1994) 
Belinda Emmett (Tracy) joins the cast, while Rachael Beck (Sam) departs. Simone Buchanan (Debbie) and Tayce Krok (Tessa McArthur) return for their final guest appearances. Added to the opening credits are Mark Owen-Taylor and Belinda Emmett.

Season 14 (1994) 
Barry Crocker makes a guest appearance as Greg's father (Charles Russell), and Christopher Truswell (Nudge) returns for the series finale curtain call.

References 
 Hey Dad..! episode listing at the Internet Movie Database

Hey Dad